The Legends of the Summer Stadium Tour was a co-headlining concert tour by American singer-songwriter Justin Timberlake and American rapper Jay Z. The tour supported Timberlake's third studio album, The 20/20 Experience (2013) and Jay Z's twelfth studio album, Magna Carta Holy Grail (2013). Overall, the duo performed to 622,559 fans in two countries, grossing a total of US$75.3 million. With the 14 dates sold-out, it was the 15th highest-grossing tour of 2013.

Background 
After a six-year musical hiatus, on January 14, 2013, Timberlake released "Suit & Tie", the lead single from the singer's third studio album, The 20/20 Experience which featured American rapper Jay-Z. Prior the 2013 Grammy Awards ceremony, Ryan Seacrest interviewed Timberlake and teased him about a possible joint tour with another artist. On that Timberlake responded, "We are still putting it together, but it's gonna be a lot of fun. I don't know how much I should say."

During the award ceremony, Timberlake was joined by Jay-Z at the stage for the performance of "Suit & Tie". Following their appearance on Grammys, rumors of a stadium tour between the artists were raised as a result of Jay-Z's posts on his Life + Times blog; he posted series of venues with the note "#LegendsOfSummer this week". The Legends of the Summer tour was officially announced on February 22, 2013, when North American dates were revealed. The show started on July 17, 2013 in Toronto, Canada. The tickets for the show went on sale on February 28, with the pre-sale starting on February 27. Citi cardmembers had access to pre-sale tickets beginning on Friday, February 22, at 12 noon local time through Citi's Private Pass Program.

On July 14, 2013, Timberlake and Jay-Z performed at the Olympic Park in London, United Kingdom as part of the Wireless Festival for a "special preview" of the tour.

Critical response
Jeff Rosenthal from Rolling Stone, who attended the show at the Yankee Stadium, highlighted the great chemistry between both artists: "Watching Justin Timberlake and Jay Z interact onstage it feels like the two have forever been friends and collaborators." Similarly, Billboard's  Karen Bliss—after attend the Toronto's Rogers Centre date—thought "there was no one-upmanship, just camaraderie, not competition, two guys that work well together." She added "Jay Z has always been a masterful rapper, but what Timberlake displayed throughout the night was just how musical he is. His past concerts have so many dancers bounding this way and that, and him joining them, that it's distracting and takes away from his significant talents: his ability to deliver his soulful and grinding pop tunes as the frontman of an expert band and highlight his own musicianship, playing upright piano, keyboards and electric and acoustic guitar— which he did on some of his songs and some of Jay Z's."

Set list 
The following set list is representative of the show on July 28, 2013. It does not represent all concerts for the duration of the tour.

"Holy Grail"
"I Just Wanna Love U (Give It 2 Me)"
"Rock Your Body"
"I Want You Back"
"Izzo (H.O.V.A.)"
"Excuse Me Miss"
"Señorita"
"On to the Next One"
"Like I Love You"
"My Love"
"Big Pimpin'"
"Tunnel Vision"
"Jigga What, Jigga Who"
"U Don't Know"
"99 Problems"
"Public Service Announcement"
"Hard Knock Life (Ghetto Anthem)"
"Heart of the City"
"Pusher Love Girl"
"Summer Love"
"LoveStoned"
"Until the End of Time"
"Cry Me a River"
"Take Back the Night"
"What Goes Around... Comes Around"
"Dirt Off Your Shoulder"
"Niggas in Paris"
"Tom Ford"
"New York, New York"
"Empire State of Mind"
"Mirrors"
"Run This Town"
"Encore"
"SexyBack"
"Suit & Tie"
"Young Forever"

Tour dates

References 

Co-headlining concert tours
Justin Timberlake concert tours
Jay-Z concert tours
2013 concert tours